Ramayana is one of the ancient Indian epics, with the first work being dated by scholars to around the 3rd century BC. The original set in Sanskrit consists of 24,000 verses, and there are several variations in the story narrated in South Asian and South East Asian cultures, across India, Thailand and Indonesia, with several versions re-written in various Asian and Indian languages.

The earliest known written version of Ramayana in the Tamil language, in the 12th century AD, by Kambar as Ramavataram (popularly known as Kamba Ramayanam).

Sangam Literature
The age of Sangam literature (Tamil: சங்க இலக்கியம், caṅka ilakkiyam) refers to the ancient Tamil literature written up to AD 100.

Purananuru
The earliest reference to the story of the Ramayana is found in the Purananuru which is dated from 1st century BCE and 5th century CE. Purananuru 378, attributed to the poet UnPodiPasunKudaiyar, written in praise of the Chola king IlanCetCenni. The poem makes the analogy of a poet receiving royal gifts and that worn by the relatives of the poet as being unworthy for their status, to the event in the Ramayana, where Sita drops her jewels when abducted by Ravana and these jewels being picked up red-faced monkeys who delightfully wore the ornaments (Hart and Heifetz, 1999, pp. 219–220).

Akanaṉūṟu
Akanaṉūṟu, which is dated between 1st century BCE and 2nd century CE, has a reference to the Ramayana in poem 70. The poem places a triumphant Rama at Dhanushkodi, sitting under a Banyan tree, involved in some secret discussions, when the birds are chirping away.

Twin Epics of the Common Era

Silappatikaram
The Silappatikaram (translated as The Tale of an anklet) written by a prince turned Jain monk Ilango Adigal, dated to the 2nd century AD or later. The epic narrates the tale of Kovalan, son of a wealthy merchant, his wife Kannagi, and his lover Madhavi, and has many references to the Ramayana story. It describes the fate of Poompuhar suffering the same agony as experienced by Ayodhya when Rama leaves for exile to the forest as instructed by his father (Dikshitar, 1939, p. 193). The Aycciyarkuravai section (canto 27), makes mention of the Lord who could measure the three worlds, going to the forest with his brother, waging a war against Lanka and destroying it with fire (Dikshitar, 1939, p. 237). This seems to imply on Rama being regarded as divinity, rather than a mere human. These references indicate that the author was well aware of the story of the Ramayana in the 2nd century AD.

Manimekalai
Manimekalai written as the sequel to the Silappatikaram by the Buddhist poet Chithalai Chathanar, narrates the tale of Manimekalai, the daughter of Kovalan and Madhavi, and her journey to become a Buddhist Bhikkuni. This epic also makes several references to the Ramayana, such as a setu (bridge) being built by monkeys in canto 5, line 37 (however the location is Kanyakumari rather than Dhanushkodi). In another reference, in canto 17, lines 9 to 16, the epic talks about Rama being the incarnate of Trivikrama or Netiyon, and he building the setu with the help of monkeys who hurled huge rocks into the ocean to build the bridge. Further, canto 18, lines 19 to 26, refers to the illegitimate love of Indra for Ahalya the 
wife of Rishi Gautama(Pandian, 1931, p. 149)(Aiyangar, 1927, p. 28).

Alvar literature
The Alvars were Vaishnavite Tamil poets -saints of South India who composed literature preaching bhakti (devotion) to the god Vishnu and his avatars. Modern scholars place Alvar literature between the 5th and 10th Centuries CE.

Kulasekhara Alvar
Kulasekhara Alvar is the seventh in the line of the 12 Alvars. Kulasekhara Alvar rules as the Chera king of Travancore, with scholars dating his period as first half of the 9th century CE. The King gradually takes interest in religious matters, much to the concern of his ministers. On a certain occasion, on hearing the narration of the Ramayana incident of Rama standing up to the battle against demons, he plunges into the sea to swim to Ceylon to rescue Sita. His compositions include the Perumal Tirumoli in Tamil and Mukundamala in Sanskrit (Hooper, 1929, p. 20).

Thirumangai Alvar
The Periya Tirumoli, written by Thirumangai Alvar (8th century CE) in verse 8, refers to Guhan, the fisherman king who Rama persuades not to follow him into exile while crossing the Ganges, and Hanuman, the son of the wind god Vayu (Hooper, 1929, p.41).

Andal
Andal's Thiruppavai, verse 12 makes mention of the Lord Rama who slew the Lord of Lanka, Ravana (Hooper, 1929, p. 53).

Nammalvar
Nammalvar's Tiruviruttam, verse 36, speaks of the friend of the Alvar who criticises the Lord who once destroyed the crowded halls of Lanka (for the sake of Sita), but fails to relieve the grief of the Alvar (Hooper, 1929, p.71).

Influence on Tamil Kingdoms

References 

Tamil-language literature
Sangam literature
Works based on the Ramayana
Tamil Hindu literature